Car Masters: Rust to Riches is an American reality television series on Netflix. The premise revolves around the crew from Gotham Garage, who have built a number of props for movie studios and television shows over the years. The group, led by Mark Towle, give classic cars modern makeovers in an attempt to raise their value and ultimately earn the company large profits. Each episode takes up one unique project.

The first season of Car Masters: Rust to Riches, consisting of eight episodes, was released on September 14, 2018. The second season was released on March 27, 2020. Recently, there have been some concerns about the show's authenticity due to the insufficient coverage of the mechanical processes and the secrecy around its cast members. Season three premiered on August 4, 2021.

The fourth season premiered on July 27, 2022.

Episodes

Season 1 (2018)

Season 2 (2020)

Season 3 (2021)

Season 4 (2022)

Release
The first season of Car Masters: Rust to Riches was released on September 14, 2018 on Netflix.

References

External links
 
 

Automotive television series
2010s American reality television series
2020s American reality television series
2018 American television series debuts
2020 American television seasons
English-language Netflix original programming
Television shows set in California